Carenum amplicolle is a species of ground beetle in the subfamily Scaritinae. It was described by Sloane in 1897.

References

amplicolle
Beetles described in 1897